Pyrolytic coating is a thin film coating applied at high temperatures and sprayed onto the glass surface during the float glass process.

Advantages
Relatively durable coating.
 Can be tempered after coating application.
 Can be used in single glazing applications.

Applications
Pyrolytic coating can be used as a protective or decorative coating on equipment parts, energy-insulator on window glasses, anti-friction agent in moulding applications.

See also

 Pyrolytic chromium carbide coating

External links
Welsh Insulating Glass
Pyrolytic Chromium Carbide Coating

Glass coating and surface modification